"Verdammt wir leben noch" is a song by Falco from his posthumously-published album Verdammt wir leben noch (1999). The song was also released as a single.

Background and writing 
The song is credited to Falco, Thomas Rabitsch, and Thomas Lang.

Commercial performance 
The song reached no. 26 in Austria.

Track listings 
CD single Hansa 74321 70498 2 (Sony) (1999)
 "Verdammt wir leben noch" (Radio Version) (3:57)
 "Verdammt wir leben noch" (Album Version) (5:18)
 "Verdammt wir leben noch" (Remix) (4:26)

Charts

References

External links 
 Falco – "Verdammt wir leben noch" at Discogs

1999 songs
1999 singles
Falco (musician) songs
Hansa Records singles
Songs written by Falco (musician)